Major General William George Henderson,   (19 July 1919 – 10 October 1995) was a senior officer in the Australian Army.

Biography
Born in Clifton Hill, Victoria, on 19 July 1919, Henderson graduated from the Royal Military College, Duntroon in June 1941. An infantryman, he served in the Second World War, Korean War, Malayan Emergency and Vietnam War. He attended Staff College at Cabarlah in 1945 before holding appointments at Western Command in Perth and as Brigade Major (effectively Chief of Staff) of 13th Infantry Brigade, also in Western Australia.

Henderson commanded the 2nd Battalion, Royal Australian Regiment (2 RAR) from November 1957 to November 1958. Later, between June 1970 and February 1971 he served as Commander 1st Australian Task Force (1 ATF) in South Vietnam. He died on 10 October 1995.

Notes

References

Further reading

1919 births
1995 deaths
Australian Companions of the Distinguished Service Order
Australian generals
Australian military personnel of the Korean War
Australian military personnel of the Vietnam War
Australian Army personnel of World War II
Australian Officers of the Order of the British Empire
Military personnel from Melbourne
Officers of the Order of Australia
Royal Military College, Duntroon graduates
Australian military personnel of the Malayan Emergency
People from Clifton Hill, Victoria